The Diocese of Waterford and Lismore (Irish: Deoise Phort Láirge agus Leasa Móire ) is a Roman Catholic diocese in Ireland. It is one of six suffragan dioceses in the ecclesiastical province of Cashel (also known as Munster) and is subject to the Archbishop of Cashel and Emly.<ref name=chdiowaterford>Diocese of Waterford and Lismore . Catholic-Hierarchy. Retrieved 3 June 2011.</ref> The Reverend Dr. Alphonsus Cullinan was installed Bishop of the Diocese of Waterford and Lismore on 12 April 2015. The Bishop Emeritus is William Lee.

Parishes
The geographic remit of the diocese includes Waterford city and the county of Waterford as well as part of counties Tipperary and Cork. As well as Waterford city, the diocese contains the towns of Cahir, Carrick-on-Suir, Dungarvan and Tramore. There are 45 parishes in the diocese with an estimated Catholic population of 44,000.

Ordinaries

See also
 Catholic Church in Ireland
Barony of Iffa and Offa East

References

External links
 official website
 Diocese of Waterford and Lismore, GCatholic
 Diocese of Waterford and Lismore, from the Catholic Encyclopedia'', The Mary Foundation 

 
1363 establishments in Ireland
Roman Catholic Ecclesiastical Province of Cashel